Victor Dalmuth Shealy (born July 14, 1961) is an American football coach and former player. He was most recently the head coach at Houston Christian University. He was previously the defensive coordinator and cornerbacks coach at the University of Kansas.  From 1995 to 1998, Shealy served as the head football coach at Azusa Pacific University, compiling a record of 27–14–1.  In 1998, he coached the team to the NAIA Football National Championship.  For his efforts that season, Shealy was named the NAIA Coach of the Year and the American Football Quarterly Schutt National Coach of the Year.

Early career
Shealy was born in Nashville, Tennessee in 1961, the son of football coach Dal Shealy.  He attended Auburn High School in Auburn, Alabama, playing quarterback for the Auburn High Tigers before playing for Liberty Baptist College, now Liberty University, in 1979.  After a year at Liberty, Shealy transferred to the University of Richmond, from where he graduated in 1984.  Shealy immediately entered the coaching profession as a graduate assistant at Baylor University—receiving a master's degree from that institution in 1986—before being appointed secondary coach at Mars Hill College in 1986.  Shealy became offensive coordinator at Austin Peay State University from 1988 to 1990, when he briefly left the coaching ranks.  He returned to Mars Hill as offensive coordinator in 1992, and in 1993 left again for Austin Peay where he was secondary coach and, in 1994, defensive coordinator.

Azusa Pacific
In 1995, Shealy was named head coach of the Azusa Pacific Cougars football team.  In his first year, he led the team to a 4–4–1 record, followed by a 7–3 season in 1996, the first winning season for Azusa Pacific since 1990.  Shealy's Cougars fell to 4–5 in 1997, but in 1998 Azusa Pacific went 12–2, winning the NAIA national championship over Olivet Nazarene, 17–14.  He was named the NAIA Coach of the Year and received the Shutt Coach of the Year Award from the American Football Quarterly.  Shealy left Azusa Pacific after that season to take a defensive coaching position at the United States Air Force Academy.  His overall record at Azusa Pacific was 27–14–1.

Division I FBS coaching positions
At the Air Force Academy, Shealy coached the defensive secondary from 1999 through 2004.  In 2005, Shealy left to become defensive coordinator at the University of Nevada, Las Vegas, where he also served as assistant head coach and safeties coach. In 2009, he began serving as the University of Richmond defensive coordinator. In 2010, he took the role of cornerbacks coach with the University of Kansas.

Houston Baptist
Shealy was named Houston Baptist University's first head football coach on April 9, 2012. In HBU's first official season in 2014, the Huskies registered their first Southland Conference win on Homecoming, defeating Nicholls, 31–21, on October 25. Five student-athletes earned all-conference honors, including two second-team selections, one academic all-conference honoree and one tabbed Freshman All-America. In Shealy’s second year, two more Huskies earned all-conference honors and one was named to the academic all-conference team. Linebacker Garrett Dolan ranked among the top 10 nationally in tackles per game and punter Christian Guzman ranked among the top 10 nationally in yards per punt. On November 21, 2022, Shealy resigned his position as HCU Head Coach. He finished his coaching tenure at HCU with a record of 21-79 in ten seasons.

Head coaching record

References

External links
 Houston Christian profile

1961 births
Living people
Air Force Falcons football coaches
Azusa Pacific Cougars football coaches
Austin Peay Governors football coaches
Baylor Bears football coaches
Houston Christian Huskies football coaches
Kansas Jayhawks football players
Liberty Flames football players
Mars Hill Lions football coaches
Richmond Spiders football coaches
UNLV Rebels football coaches
Auburn High School (Alabama) alumni
Baylor University alumni
University of Richmond alumni
Players of American football from Nashville, Tennessee